The 2005 College Football All-America Team is composed of the following All-American Teams: Associated Press, Football Writers Association of America, American Football Coaches Association, Walter Camp Foundation, The Sporting News, Sports Illustrated, Pro Football Weekly, ESPN, CBS Sports, College Football News, and Rivals.com. 

The College Football All-America Team is an honor given annually to the best American college football players at their respective positions. The original usage of the term All-America seems to have been to such a list selected by football pioneer Walter Camp in the 1890s. The NCAA officially recognizes All-Americans selected by the AP, AFCA, FWAA, TSN, and the WCFF to determine Consensus All-Americans.

Eighteen players were recognized as consensus All-Americans for 2005, 12 of them unanimously. Unanimous selections are followed by an asterisk (*)

Offense

Quarterback
Vince Young, Texas (AP, FWAA, TSN, SI, PFW, ESPN, CBS, CFN, Rivals.com) 
Matt Leinart, Southern California (AFCA, WCFF)

Running backs
Reggie Bush, Southern California (AP, AFCA, FWAA, TSN, WCFF, SI, PFW, ESPN, CBS, CFN, Rivals.com-All-purpose) 
Jerome Harrison, Washington State (AP, FWAA, TSN, SI, ESPN, CBS, CFN, Rivals.com)
DeAngelo Williams, Memphis (AFCA, Walter Camp)
Laurence Maroney, Minnesota (PFW, Rivals.com )

Fullback
Brian Leonard, Rutgers (PFW)

Wide receivers
Dwayne Jarrett, Southern California (AP, AFCA, FWAA, TSN, WCFF, SI, CBS, CFN)
Jeff Samardzija, Notre Dame (FWAA, TSN, SI, PFW, ESPN, CBS, CFN, Rivals.com) 
Mike Hass, Oregon State (AP, WCFF, ESPN) 
Calvin Johnson, Georgia Tech (AFCA, PFW, Rivals.com)

Tight end
Vernon Davis, Maryland (AP, AFCA, PFW, CFN)
Marcedes Lewis, UCLA (FWAA, TSN, WCFF, Rivals.com)
Garrett Mills, Tulsa (SI, ESPN, CBS)

Linemen
Jonathan Scott, Texas (AP, AFCA, FWAA, TSN, WCFF, SI, ESPN, CBS)
Marcus McNeill, Auburn (AP, FWAA, TSN, WCFF, SI, ESPN, CFN, Rivals.com)
Max Jean-Gilles, Georgia (AP, AFCA, TSN, WCFF, PFW, ESPN, CFN, Rivals.com) 
Eric Winston, Miami (FL) (AFCA, WCFF, SI, CBS, CFN, Rivals.com) 
Taitusi Lutui, Southern California (AFCA, FWAA, TSN, SI, ESPN, CBS, Rivals.com)
D'Brickashaw Ferguson, Virginia (AP, PFW) 
Zach Strief, Northwestern (FWAA)
Sam Baker, Southern California (CBS)  
Justin Blalock, Texas (CFN) 
Davin Joseph, Oklahoma (PFW, CFN) 
Joe Thomas, Wisconsin (PFW)

Center
Greg Eslinger, Minnesota (AP, AFCA, FWAA, TSN, WCFF, SI, ESPN, CBS, Rivals.com)
Nick Mangold, Ohio State (PFW)

Defense

Ends
Tamba Hali, Penn State (AP, AFCA, FWAA, TSN, WCFF, ESPN, CBS, Rivals.com)
Elvis Dumervil, Louisville (AP, AFCA, FWAA, TSN, WCFF, SI, ESPN, CBS, CFN)
Mario Williams, North Carolina State (SI, PFW)
Mathias Kiwanuka, Boston College (AFCA, CBS, Rivals.com)
Darryl Tapp, Virginia Tech (AFCA, CFN) 
Kamerion Wimbley, Florida State (PFW)

Tackles
Haloti Ngata, Oregon (AP, FWAA, TSN, WCFF, SI, ESPN, CFN, Rivals.com) 
Rodrique Wright, Texas (AP, TSN, WCFF, ESPN, CBS); 
Brodrick Bunkley, Florida State (FWAA, SI, PFW); 
Claude Wroten, LSU (CFN); 
Kyle Williams, LSU (PFW, Rivals.com)

Linebackers
A. J. Hawk, Ohio State (AP, AFCA, FWAA, TSN, WCFF, SI, PFW, ESPN, CBS, CFN, Rivals.com)
Paul Posluszny, Penn State (AP, FWAA, TSN, WCFF, SI, ESPN, CBS, Rivals.com) 
DeMeco Ryans, Alabama (AP, AFCA, FWAA, TSN, WCFF, ESPN, CBS, Rivals.com)
D’Qwell Jackson, Maryland (AFCA, SI)
Chad Greenway, Iowa (PFW, CFN)
Patrick Willis, Ole Miss, (PFW, CFN)

Backs
Jimmy Williams, Virginia Tech (AP, AFCA, FWAA, TSN, WCFF, ESPN, CBS, CFN, Rivals.com) 
Michael Huff, Texas (AP, AFCA, FWAA, TSN, WCFF, SI, PFW, ESPN, CBS, CFN, Rivals.com)
Greg Blue, Georgia  (AP, AFCA, TSN, WCFF, SI, ESPN, CFN)
Darnell Bing, Southern California (AP, Rivals.com)
Dion Byrum, Ohio (AFCA)
Ko Simpson, South Carolina (FWAA, CBS, CFN) 
Brandon Meriweather, Miami-FL (FWAA)
Tye Hill, Clemson (TSN, WCFF, ESPN, Rivals.com)
Kelly Jennings, Miami-FL (SI, PFW, CBS) 
Dwayne Slay, Texas Tech (SI)
Alan Zemaitis, Penn State (PFW) 
Donte Whitner, Ohio State (PFW)

Special teams

Kicker
Mason Crosby, Colorado (AP, FWAA, TSN, WCFF, SI, PFW, ESPN, CBS, CFNews, Rivals.com) 
Alexis Serna, Oregon State (AFCA)

Punter
Ryan Plackemeier, Wake Forest (AP, AFCA, FWAA, TSN, WCFF, SI, ESPN, CBS, CFN, Rivals.com)
 Danny Baugher, Arizona (PFW)

Returners
Maurice Drew, UCLA (AP-All-Purpose, AFCA-Return Specialist, FWAA, TSN, WCFF, SI-PR, PFWeekly-PR, CBS, CFN-PR) 
Cory Rodgers, TCU (SI-KR, PFW-KR, ESPN) 
Felix Jones, Arkansas (CFN-KR) 
Skyler Green, LSU (Rivals.com-PR)
Ted Ginn Jr., Ohio State (Rivals.com-KR)

See also
 2005 All-Big Ten Conference football team
 2005 All-Big 12 Conference football team
 2005 All-Pacific-10 Conference football team
 2005 All-SEC football team

External links

2005 AP All-American Team
2005 Coaches All-American Team
2005 Writers All-American Team
2005 Walter Camp Foundation All-American Team
2005 The Sporting News All-American Team
2005 Sports Illustrated All-American Team

 2005 Pro Football Weekly All-American Team
2005 ESPN All-American Team
2005 CBS Sportsline All-American Team
2005 College Football News All-American Team
2005 Rivals.com All-American Team
 2007 NCAA Record Book

All-America Team
College Football All-America Teams